South Dorset by-election may refer to:

 1891 South Dorset by-election
 1941 South Dorset by-election
 1962 South Dorset by-election